The Connetquot River (also known as Great River) is a  river in Islip, New York.  It is one of the four longest rivers on Long Island and is recognized by the state as a Wild, Scenic and Recreational River. It is particularly known for its brook, brown and rainbow trout fly fishing.

Description 
The upper reaches of the river including its headwaters are totally in the Connetquot River State Park Preserve or Lakeland County Park before it becomes an estuary. It starts just south of the Long Island Expressway from springs in the Lakeland County Park in Islandia where it is called Connetquot Brook.  The estuary portion south of Sunrise Highway at Oakdale is officially called the Connetquot River although in popular usage both the brook and river share the same name.

The name comes from the Secatogue tribe name for "Great River" and is different from the Carmans River on Long Island which at one time was called the Connecticut River.

The entire Connetquot River watershed habitat represents the largest undeveloped contiguous area within Suffolk County that covers an entire river watershed. The river is generated entirely from groundwater springs, and like all other rivers on Long Island, does not arise from a lake.

List of crossings of the Connetquot River

See also 

 Mill River – Another north-south river on Long Island, located further west in Nassau County.

References

External links
 New York State Parks: Connetquot River State Park Preserve

Rivers of Suffolk County, New York
Rivers of New York (state)
Islip (town), New York
Smithtown, New York